The 1972 FIBA Korać Cup was the inaugural edition of FIBA's competition for European basketball non national champions and cup winners, running from 4 January to 7 March 1972. 8 teams took part in the competition.

Lokomotiva from Zagreb defeated OKK Beograd (another Yugoslav club), in a two-legged final to become the competition's first champion.

Season teams

Quarter finals

|}

Semi finals

|}

Finals

|}

References
Linguasport 1972 FIBA Korać Cup
1972 FIBA Korać Cup

FIBA Korać Cup
Korać